Émile-Antoine Bayard (2 November 1837 – 6 December 1891) was a French illustrator born in La Ferté-sous-Jouarre, Seine-et-Marne. A student of Léon Cogniet, he is known for his illustration of Cosette from Les Misérables by Victor Hugo. He died in Cairo.

Career 
Starting in 1853, Bayard was a student of Cogniet for five years, publishing his first cartoons at the age of fifteen, often using the anagrammatic pseudonym, Abel De Miray.

Between 1857 and 1864, he worked in the mediums of charcoal drawings, paintings, watercolors, woodcuts, engravings, and lithographs. In 1864, he began to work primarily for magazines, and illustrated current events such as the Franco-Prussian War of 1870–71.

At the end of the 19th century, with a growing interest in photography displacing documentary drawing, Bayard moved to illustrating novels, including Les Misérables by Victor Hugo, Uncle Tom's Cabin by Harriet Beecher Stowe, L'Immortel by Alphonse Daudet, "Robinson Crusoé by Daniel De Foë, and From the Earth to the Moon by Jules Verne. His illustration of Cosette from Les Misérables was adapted for the logo from the Cameron Mackintosh musical.

Space art 

While there had been art depicting spaceflight and alien worlds prior to 1865, they were based heavily on mysticism as opposed to science. Bayard's artwork accompanying From the Earth to the Moon by Jules Verne is considered among the first Space art of a scientific nature.

Gallery

References

External links 
 
 

1837 births
1891 deaths
People from La Ferté-sous-Jouarre
French illustrators
Jules Verne
Academic art
19th-century French novelists